The 1997 Men's Asian Basketball Confederation Championship was held in Riyadh, Saudi Arabia.

Qualification

According to the FIBA Asia rules, each zone had two places, and the hosts (Saudi Arabia) and the best 5 teams of the previous Asian Championship were automatically qualified.

Preliminary round

Group A

Group B

Group C

Group D

Quarterfinal round

Group I

Group II

Group III

Group IV

Classification 5th–14th

13th place

11th place

9th place

7th place

5th place

Final round

Semifinals

3rd place

Final

Final standing

Awards

Most Valuable Player:  Chun Hee-Chul
Best Scorer:  Abdulmajeed Ali
Best Playmaker:  Kang Dong-Hee
Best 3-Pointer:  Alexey Yeropkin
Best Coach:  Kim Dong-Kwang
Sportsmanship Award:  Romel Adducul

References

External links
 Results
 Archive.fiba.com

ABC
B
1997
ABC
ABC Championship